Janowice Wielkie  is a village in Jelenia Góra County, Lower Silesian Voivodeship, in south-western Poland. It is the seat of the administrative district (gmina) called Gmina Janowice Wielkie. The population is circa 2,100.

Until May 1945 Jannowitz was in Germany, the far-western part of Silesia, and a summer resort in the foothills of the Silesian or Great Mountains. From here is a direct route south to Bolczów Castle (elevation ), the imposing ruins of an old castle destroyed by the Swedes in 1643.

At the end of World War II, Jannowitz fell into the Soviet Zone of occupation, with the rest of Silesia. The Soviets handed the entire province over to their client state, communist Poland. The German population was expelled.

Photo gallery

References

External links 

 Janowice Wielkie
 Official site of Janowice Wielkie
 Janowice Wielkie/Rudawy Janowickie on the map

Villages in Karkonosze County